Putnam is a town in Callahan County, Texas, United States. The population was 94 at the 2010 census. It is part of the Abilene, Texas Metropolitan Statistical Area.

Geography
Putnam is located in northeastern Callahan County at  (32.370560, −99.194613). Interstate 20 passes through the town, leading west  to Baird, the county seat, and east 12 miles to Cisco.

Climate
The climate in this area is characterized by hot summers and generally mild to cool winters.  According to the Köppen Climate Classification system, Putnam has a humid subtropical climate, abbreviated "Cfa" on climate maps.

Demographics

2020 census

As of the 2020 United States census, there were 63 people, 41 households, and 26 families residing in the town.

2000 census
As of the census of 2000, there were 88 people, 39 households, and 23 families residing in the town. The population density was 86.9 people per square mile (33.6/km2). There were 56 housing units at an average density of 55.3 per square mile (21.4/km2). The racial makeup of the town was 96.59% White, 1.14% Asian, 2.27% from other races. Hispanic or Latino of any race were 3.41% of the population.

There were 39 households, out of which 17.9% had children under the age of 18 living with them, 59.0% were married couples living together, 2.6% had a female householder with no husband present, and 38.5% were non-families. 33.3% of all households were made up of individuals, and 17.9% had someone living alone who was 65 years of age or older. The average household size was 2.26 and the average family size was 2.79.

In the town, the population was spread out, with 15.9% under the age of 18, 11.4% from 18 to 24, 22.7% from 25 to 44, 33.0% from 45 to 64, and 17.0% who were 65 years of age or older. The median age was 45 years. For every 100 females, there were 95.6 males. For every 100 females age 18 and over, there were 94.7 males.

The median income for a household in the town was $21,875, and the median income for a family was $31,250. Males had a median income of $35,833 versus $17,917 for females. The per capita income for the town was $13,562. There were 21.7% of families and 28.0% of the population living below the poverty line, including 33.3% of under eighteens and 15.0% of those over 64.

Education
The town of Putnam is served by the Baird Independent School District.

Notable people

 Larry L. King, writer and playwright, author of The Best Little Whorehouse in Texas, was born in Putnam in 1929
 Stan Williams, American football player

References

Towns in Callahan County, Texas
Towns in Texas
Abilene metropolitan area